The Zhidou D2 is an all-electric car that is manufactured by the Chinese manufacturer Zhi Dou Electric Vehicle Corporation—sometimes called Zhidou Auto or ZD Auto. They were also used by car sharing company Sharengo in Milan and other Italian cities since 2013.

History
Originally launched simply as the Zhidou, and later Zhidou D1 and D2. The Zhidou D2, which went on the market in June 2015, is an improved and updated version of the same car featuring updated styling and performance.

Charging for the Zhidou D2 takes 8 to 10 hours for a full charge on 220V power source.

Zotye E20
The Zotye E20 is a variant of the D2 that Zhidou makes for Zotye Automotive.  The Zotye E20 was originally unveiled as a pre-production concept car during the 2014 Beijing Auto Show in April 2014, at a price of 108,800 yuan ($17,700) without subsidies.

Charging for the Zotye E20 is six hours on a 220V power source for a full charge, and 20 minutes on a fast charger for an 80% charge.

Green energy subsidies from central and local government in China brings the price down to 48,800 yuan ($7,944), which is a total subsidy of 60,000 yuan ($9,760).

References

External links

Microcars
Electric city cars
Production electric cars
2010s cars
Cars introduced in 2014
Cars of China
Hatchbacks